The 1971 FIM Motocross World Championship was the 15th F.I.M. Motocross Racing World Championship season.

Summary
Roger De Coster won his first 500cc world championship for Suzuki in a tight points battle with Maico rider Åke Jonsson. The championship wasn't decided until the final round of the season when Jonsson suffered a mechanical failure. De Coster's victory at the season opening Italian Grand Prix gave Suzuki the first ever victory for a Japanese factory in a 500cc motocross Grand Prix. Joël Robert, claimed his fourth consecutive 250cc title, and second since joining the Suzuki factory racing team. It was his fifth 250cc world championship overall in his career.

Grands Prix

500cc

250cc

Final standings

References

External links
 

FIM Motocross World Championship season
Motocross World Championship seasons